The Socialist Democratic Party was a political party in Chile. It was founded in 1964, through the merger of the Socialist People's Party, the National Left Movement and some sectors of the erstwhile Democratic Party (the ones that had not merged into the National Democratic Party). PDS contested the 1965 parliamentary election, but failed to win any seats. The party was dissolved shortly thereafter.

References

Defunct political parties in Chile
1964 establishments in Chile
Political parties established in 1964
1965 disestablishments in Chile
Political parties disestablished in 1965